Wild Horse is a 1931 American Western film directed by Richard Thorpe and starring Hoot Gibson and Alberta Vaughn. It was based on the Cosmopolitan Magazine short story by Peter B. Kyne.

Cast
Hoot Gibson - Jim Wright
Alberta Vaughn - Alice Hall
Stepin Fetchit - Stepin
Neal Hart - Hank Howard
Edmund Cobb - Gil Davis
George Bunny - Col. Ben Hall
Edward Peil, Sr. - Sheriff
Skeeter Bill Robbins - Skeeter Bill Burke
Joe Rickson - Deputy Clark
Fred Gilman - Wally the Drunk

References

External links
Wild Horse at IMDb.com

 Wild Horse(Youtube)

1931 films
Films directed by Richard Thorpe
American Western (genre) films
1931 Western (genre) films
American black-and-white films
Films based on short fiction
1930s American films
1930s English-language films